Nicolás Gastón Avellaneda (born 24 February 1993) is an Argentine professional footballer who plays as a goalkeeper for San Martín SJ, on loan from Defensa y Justicia.

Career
Avellaneda was promoted into the first-team squad of Lanús in 2013, appearing on the subs bench against Estudiantes on 19 June. He went unused, as Avellaneda did a further twenty-five times between then and the end of 2017. On 21 January 2018, fellow Primera División side Defensa y Justicia signed Avellaneda. He was on the bench for twelve fixtures in 2017–18, prior to eventually making his debut in Defensa's penultimate match of the season versus Newell's Old Boys on 5 May; due to the ineligibility of Ezequiel Unsain. He wouldn't appear again, despite appearing on the sidelines sixty-five times across two seasons.

Avellaneda spent the 2020 campaign on loan to Primera Nacional with Ferro Carril Oeste; initially planned to last until December 2021. His first appearance occurred on 12 December 2020 against Deportivo Morón, which preceded six further appearances for the club. On 18 February 2021, having cut short his time with Ferro, Avellaneda penned permanent terms with fellow second tier team Santamarina.

In December 2021, Avellaneda signed with San Martín de San Juan.

Career statistics
.

Honours
Lanús
Supercopa Argentina: 2016

References

External links

1993 births
Living people
Sportspeople from Córdoba Province, Argentina
Argentine footballers
Argentine expatriate footballers
Association football goalkeepers
Argentine Primera División players
Primera Nacional players
Club Atlético Lanús footballers
Defensa y Justicia footballers
Ferro Carril Oeste footballers
Club y Biblioteca Ramón Santamarina footballers
San Martín de San Juan footballers
San Luis de Quillota footballers
Primera B de Chile players
Expatriate footballers in Chile